Rage City Roller Derby is a women's flat track roller derby league based in Anchorage, Alaska. Rage City currently consists of two teams, the Rage City All*Stars and Sockeye Sallys . The Rage City All-Stars represent the best of Rage City and travel all over the world to compete in bouts. Sockeye Sallys is RCR's "b-team", playing mostly home games and bouts throughout the state. Rage City is a member of the Women's Flat Track Derby Association (WFTDA).

History
The league was founded as Rage City Rollergirls in 2007 by a group of women, some of whom had previously watched roller derby elsewhere in the United States. It played its first bout in May 2008, attracting a crowd of more than 1,000 fans. This was the first flat track roller derby bout in Alaska.

Rage City joined the Women's Flat Track Derby Association Apprentice program in April 2010, and became full members of the WFTDA in March 2011.

WFTDA rankings

References

Roller derby leagues established in 2007
Roller derby leagues in Alaska
Sports in Anchorage, Alaska
2007 establishments in Alaska